The 1994 Sultan Azlan Shah Cup was the fifth edition of field hockey tournament the Sultan Azlan Shah Cup.

Participating nations
Five countries participated in the 1994 tournament:

Final ranking
This ranking does not reflect the actual performance of the team as the ranking issued by the International Hockey Federation. This is just a benchmark ranking in the Sultan Azlan Shah Cup only.

References

External links
Official website

1994 in field hockey
1994
1994 in Malaysian sport
1994 in South Korean sport
1994 in Pakistani sport
1994 in English sport
1994 in Australian field hockey